Holborn and Covent Garden is a ward of the London borough of Camden, in the United Kingdom. As the name suggests, it covers the parts of Holborn and Covent Garden that lie in Camden; the eastern part of Holborn lies in the City of London and the southern part of Covent Garden lies in the City of Westminster. For elections to Parliament, Holborn and Covent Garden is part of Holborn and St Pancras.

The ward lies in the far south of the borough, and is one of three wards of Camden south of Euston Road (along with Bloomsbury and King's Cross). It is separated from Bloomsbury by New Oxford Street, Bloomsbury Street, Great Russell Street, and Southampton Row; from King's Cross by Guilford Street and Calthorpe Street; from the borough of Islington by Phoenix Place, Warner Place, Herbal Hill, Clerkenwell Road, and Farringdon Road; from the City of London by Charterhouse Street, High Holborn, and Chancery Lane; and from the City of Westminster by Carey Street, Serle Street, Lincoln's Inn Fields, Sardinia Street, Wild Street, Drury Lane, Shelton Street, West Street, and Charing Cross Road. The ward will undergo boundary changes for the 2022 election. Some of its area will be transferred to the Bloomsbury ward.

The population of this ward at the 2011 Census was 11,264. In 2018, the ward had an electorate of 7,802. The Boundary Commission projects the electorate to rise to 8,341 in 2025.

Councillors

Election results
Like all other wards of Camden, Holborn and Covent Garden is represented by three councillors on Camden Borough Council. The last election was held on 3 May 2018, when all three councillors were elected. All councillors elected were members of the Labour Party.

Elections in the 2020s

* denotes an incumbent

Elections in the 2010s

* denotes an incumbent

* denotes an incumbent

Elections in the 2000s

References

Wards of the London Borough of Camden
Covent Garden
2002 establishments in England